The 2022 FIM Moto2 European Championship is the first season after leaving the historical connection to CEV and the seventh under the FIM banner.

Calendar 
The calendar was published in November 2021.

Entry list

Championship standings 

 Scoring system

Points were awarded to the top fifteen finishers. A rider had to finish the race to earn points.

Riders' championship

Constructors' championship

References 

FIM CEV Moto2 European Championship
CEV
Motorcycle races